Stampede is a 1949 American Western film directed by Lesley Selander and starring Rod Cameron, Gale Storm, Johnny Mack Brown and Don Castle.

Plot
Two brothers, Mike McCall (Rod Cameron) and Tim McCall (Don Castle), own a large ranch in Arizona and sell some of their surplus grazing land to some settlers.  When the settlers arrive they find the land bone dry because the McCall brothers have dammed the river and control all the water.

Settler John Dawson (Steve Clark) and his daughter Connie Dawson (Gale Storm) complain to the local sheriff (Johnny Mack Brown) but the sheriff claims there is nothing he can do.  A love interest develops between Tim McCall and Connie Dawson, while simultaneously the settlers try to dynamite the dam and stampede the McCall cattle.

Cast
 Rod Cameron as Mike McCall
 Gale Storm as Connie Dawson
 Johnny Mack Brown as Sheriff Aaron Ball
 Don Castle as Tim McCall
 Donald Curtis as Stanton
 John Miljan as T.J. Furman
 Jonathan Hale as Varik
 John Eldredge as Cox
 Adrian Wood as Whiskey
 Wes Christiansen as Slim (as Was C. Christiansen)
 James Harrison as Roper
 Duke York as Maxie
 Steve Clark as John Dawson
 I. Stanford Jolley as Link Spain
 Marshall Reed as Henchman Shives
 Philo McCullough as Charlie - Restaurant Proprietor

References

External links 
 
 
 
 

1949 films
1949 Western (genre) films
American Western (genre) films
1940s English-language films
Allied Artists films
American black-and-white films
Films directed by Lesley Selander
1940s American films